Prairie Dunes Country Club is a golf course located just outside Hutchinson, Kansas.  Frequently ranked among the best golf courses in the United States, it has hosted several United States Golf Association national championship tournaments.

The club was founded by Emerson Carey and his four sons in the mid-1930s. The course was funded and constructed, at least in part, by the Works Progress Administration under the New Deal.  The course was designed by Perry Maxwell, and the first nine holes opened on September 13, 1937. Twenty years later in 1957, a second 9 holes were opened, designed by Press Maxwell (Perry's son).

Events 
Trans-Mississippi Amateur: 1958, 1973, 1987, 1996, 2005, 2017
U.S. Women's Amateur: 1964, 1980, 1991
Curtis Cup Match: 1986
U.S. Mid-Amateur: 1988
U.S. Senior Amateur: 1995
U.S. Women's Open: 2002
U.S. Senior Open: 2006
NCAA Division I Men's Golf Championships: 2014
Kansas Amateur : 1962, 1967, 1976, 1984, 1993, 2010

Honors 
 Golfweek 2008 - #9 of America's Best Classical Golf Courses
 Golf Digest 2018/19 - #27 of America's Greatest Golf Courses
 Golf Magazine 2017 - #18 in the United States & #25 in the World
 Golf Digest 2001 - #2, #8 & #10 among the Best 99 Holes in the U.S. 
 Audubon International - Obtained certification in the Audubon Cooperative Sanctuary Program for Golf Courses program

References

External links
 
 Golf Club Atlas: profile

Golf clubs and courses in Kansas
Curtis Cup venues
Hutchinson, Kansas
Buildings and structures in Reno County, Kansas
Tourist attractions in Reno County, Kansas
1937 establishments in Kansas